Kobie Ferguson (born March 1999) is an Australian football (soccer) player, who last played for Broadmeadow Magic and Newcastle Jets in the Australian W-League.

Playing career

Club

Newscastle Jets, 2015–2016
Ferguson signed with Newcastle Jets in 2015. She made her debut for the team during a match against Perth Glory on 24 October 2015. During the 2015–16 W-League season, she made five appearances for Newcastle and helped the team finish in sixth place with a  record.

International 
Ferguson has represented Australia on the under-17 and under-20 national teams. In 2015, she captained the Young Matildas at the 2016 AFF Women's Championship in Vietnam.

Recent sightings 
Finnegans hotel, Coal and Cedar, Mavericks, Foodworks, Redhead Beach, Royal Crown Hotel. Ferguson enjoys hanging with her dog, Cassie and her friend Jasmine Mills.

See also

References

Further reading
 Grainey, Timothy (2012), Beyond Bend It Like Beckham: The Global Phenomenon of Women's Soccer, University of Nebraska Press, 
 Stewart, Barbara (2012), Women's Soccer: The Passionate Game, Greystone Books, 

1999 births
Living people
Australian women's soccer players
Newcastle Jets FC (A-League Women) players
A-League Women players
Women's association football midfielders